Kuniaki Kobayashi (小林邦昭) (born January 11, 1956) is a retired Japanese Junior Heavyweight professional wrestler most notable for being the generational rival of the famous Tiger Mask character in Japanese pro wrestling. He wrestled numerous acclaimed matches against the first two Tiger Masks: Satoru Sayama and Mitsuharu Misawa.

Career

New Japan Pro-Wrestling (1973–1980)
Kuniaki Kobayashi debuted in New Japan Pro-Wrestling in February 1973, against Masanobu Kurisu, at the young age of 17. Kobayashi stayed on the undercard, until he was sent abroad to North America in 1980.

North American Excursion (1980–1982)
Upon entering North America in 1980, Kobayashi's first stop was in Mexico, where he made his mark by trying to unmask the other luchadores, specially The Villanos. He also would wrestle against Los Misioneros de la Muerte putting their hair on the line. On June 6, 1981, in their first hair vs. hair encounter, Kobayashi's team, consisted of him, Gran Hamada and Enrique Vera defeated the Misioneros. Two months later, Kobayashi teamed with Saito against Coloso Colossetti and César Valentino with their hairs on the line, with Kobayashi's team once again being victorious. One year later, on June 13, 1982, Kobayashi, Saito and Takano against the Misioneros, and this time, Kobayashi's team lost the match, and got their heads shaved. After his feud with the Misioneros ended, he moved to the United States, in Los Angeles, where he wrestled under the name Kid Koby, winning the NWA Americas Heavyweight Championship from Timothy Flowers on July 18, 1982. He held the championship for 1 month, before losing it to Black Gordman.

Return To NJPW (1982–1984)
Upon returning to New Japan in October 1982, Kobayashi was involved in a feud with Tiger Mask. Because of his anti-heroic actions, he became regarded as the "Tiger Hunter." He also allied with Riki Choshu, Masa Saito, and Killer Khan to form Ishin Gundan. As an Ishin Gundan member, he mostly teamed with Isamu Teranishi in tag team action, facing New Japan's loyalists in numerous encounters, most notably Tatsumi Fujinami, Kengo Kimura, Kantaro Hoshino and a young Nobuhiko Takada. In September 1984, Ishin Gundan left NJPW to form Japan Pro Wrestling (JPW).

All Japan Pro Wrestling (1984–1987)
Japan Pro Wrestling had a working agreement with All Japan Pro Wrestling. While there, Kobayashi feuded with Tiger Mask II, and he held the NWA International Junior Heavyweight Championship by defeating Dynamite Kid on June 13, 1985 and the World Junior Heavyweight Championship after defeating Hiro Saito on November 23, 1986, and also feuded with All Japan's loyalists, such as Norio Honaga, Jumbo Tsuruta, Takashi Ishikawa and Mighty Inoue. After two years, Ishin Gundan left All Japan in March 1987 to return to New Japan.

Return to NJPW (1987–2000, 2017)
Upon returning to New Japan in 1987, Kobayashi won the vacated IWGP Junior Heavyweight Championship on August 20, by defeating Nobuhiko Takada in a tournament final, successfully defending it against the likes of Shiro Koshinaka, Owen Hart, Keiichi Yamada and Takada. He held the title until December 27, losing it to the debuting Hiroshi Hase. In 1988, he had numerous encounters with Shiro Koshinaka over the IWGP Junior Junior Championship, but he came up short on retrieving what was once his. In spite of rivaling with the champion, he and Koshinaka started to team up in tag team and six-man matches. In April 1989, he served as the first opponent of Jyushin Liger (Keiichi Yamada's first match under the Liger persona), in a losing effort at the Tokyo Dome. In 1990, he moved up to the heavyweight division, and joined the New Japan Sekigun against the Blond Outlaws. In 1992, he and Shiro Koshinaka formed the Heisei Ishingun, while feuding with two karatecas in Masashi Aoyagi and Akitoshi Saito.

Between 1992 and 1993, Kobayashi had two surgeries to combat colorectal cancer, but still wrestled a lot of matches, including one-offs with WAR against the likes of Ashura Hara, Hiromichi Fuyuki and Genichiro Tenryu. In 1999, he had surgery to combat liver cancer, leaving him with a large scar under his chest. This and the treatments to combat the cancer forced him to bring an end to his in-ring career. In April 2000, Kobayashi wrestled his final match as an active wrestler, losing to Jyushin Thunder Liger. After the bout, he received flowers from Satoru Sayama and a message from Mitsuharu Misawa, as both Tiger Masks sent their farewell sayings to their biggest rival. After his retirement, he served as color commentator and trainer at the NJPW Dojo. He made sporadic appearances, however, one being in May 2003, in a New Japan Alumnus battle royal, won by Kantaro Hoshino and Kotetsu Yamamoto. Another appearance of his occurred on was on March 6, 2007, when he served as special guest referee for an eight-man tag team match between El Texano Jr., Minoru, Tiger Mask and Wataru Inoue against El Samurai, Jushin Thunder Liger, Koji Kanemoto and Negro Casas, in which after the match, Kobayashi attacked Liger and delivered his signature Fisherman Suplex.

On January 4, 2017, Kobayashi made a special appearance for NJPW, taking part in the New Japan Rumble on the pre-show of Wrestle Kingdom 11 in Tokyo Dome. He was eliminated from the match by Tiger Mask.

Retirement
Upon his retirement, Kobayashi has remained involved in puroresu, currently as caretaker of the NJPW Dojo. He occasionally wrestles in legends matches, including a series of matches in 2011 against Sayama and a team with him in 2013 against Atsushi Onita (who led the AJPW junior heavyweight division in 1983, before Kobayashi showed up). He would also do color commentary for NJPW shows.

Championships and accomplishments
All Japan Pro Wrestling
NWA International Junior Heavyweight Championship (1 time)
World Junior Heavyweight Championship (1 time)

New Japan Pro-Wrestling
IWGP Junior Heavyweight Championship (1 time)
Greatest Wrestlers (Class of 2009)

NWA Hollywood Wrestling
NWA Americas Heavyweight Championship (1 time)

Pro Wrestling Illustrated
PWI ranked him #256 of the 500 best singles wrestlers during the PWI Years in 2003.

Tokyo Sports
Effort Award (1978)
Service Award (2000)

Wrestling Observer Newsletter awards
Match of the Year (1985) vs. Tiger Mask II on June 12

Luchas de Apuestas record

Mixed martial arts exhibition record

|-
|Loss
|align=center|0-1
| Satoru Sayama
|KO (high kick)
|Shooto: Vale Tudo Perception
|
|align=center|1
|align=center|6:05
|Tokyo, Japan
|
|-

References

1956 births
Japanese male professional wrestlers
Living people
Sportspeople from Nagano Prefecture
Stampede Wrestling alumni
IWGP Junior Heavyweight champions
World Junior Heavyweight Champions (AJPW)
NWA International Junior Heavyweight Champions
NWA Americas Heavyweight Champions